The 1999 South American Under-17 Football Championship was a football competition contested by all ten U-17 national football teams of CONMEBOL. The tournament was held in Uruguay between 4 and 21 March 1999, it was the 8th time the competition has been held and the 1st to take place in Uruguay.

This tournament gave three berths to the 1999 FIFA U-17 World Championship, which was held in New Zealand, Brazil won their fifth title and their third in a row. They qualified to the aforementioned tournament along with Paraguay and Uruguay.

Venues

First round
The 10 national teams were divided in 2 groups of 5 teams each. The top 2 teams qualified for the semi-finals.

Group A

Group B

Final round

Semi-finals

Third place match

Final

Countries to participate in 1999 FIFA U-17 World Championship
Top 3 teams qualify for 1999 FIFA U-17 World Championship:

Top goalscorers

Ideal Team of the Tournament

South American Under-17 Football Championship
International association football competitions hosted by Uruguay
Under-17 Football Championship, 1999
South
1999 in youth association football